"Farfisa Beat" is a song recorded and released by British new-wave band Squeeze.  It was released as a single in Denmark and Germany in 1980, and Switzerland in 1981. The song appears on the band's third album, Argybargy.

Background
Farfisa refers to the manufacturer of the electronic organ that gives this song its distinct sound. Musically, the song revolves around a guitar riff that Glenn Tilbrook composed. He said of the riff, "I was particularly pleased with that guitar riff, which is a minor point in its favor." Chris Difford compared the song's music to "a kind of B-52s, American club sound."

The band's opinion of the song was not high. In an interview, Tilbrook conceded that the song was a filler track. Chris Difford concluded that "the song's crap," explaining, "It's an album filler at best and one of the few which I don't remember recording at all. It was probably just stuck on the album because it was up-tempo."

Reception
In his review of Argybargy Stephen Thomas Erlewine of AllMusic wrote, that Squeeze "can kick out agreeable throwaways like 'Farfisa Beat' without missing a step" and cited the song as an example of the band having "not yet left their rock & roll roots behind". Writer Jim Drury called it "filler."

Track listing
 Farfisa Beat (2:56)
 Here Comes That Feeling (2:05)

External links
Squeeze discography at Squeezenet

References

Squeeze (band) songs
1980 singles
Songs written by Glenn Tilbrook
Songs written by Chris Difford
1980 songs
A&M Records singles